Daniel Goodwin (born November 7, 1955, in Kennebunkport, Maine) is an American climber best known for performing gymnastic-like flag maneuvers and one-arm flyoffs while free soloing difficult rock climbs on national TV and for scaling towering skyscrapers, including the Sears Tower, the John Hancock Center, the World Trade Center, the CN Tower, and (for the program Stan Lee's Superhumans) the Telefónica Building in Santiago, Chile.

Building climber 
On November 21, 1980, Dan Goodwin witnessed the MGM Grand fire in Las Vegas, Nevada, United States, including the inability of the Clark County Fire Department and the supporting fire departments to rescue scores of hotel guests trapped inside.  Believing he knew how to rescue the trapped people, Goodwin presented a rescue plan to the on-location fire boss.  Goodwin's plan included his climbing up the building and connecting cables to the floors to enable rescue baskets to be ferried to and from helicopters.  The fire boss responded by  threatening Goodwin with arrest and then ordered him escorted from the scene.  The following day, Goodwin approached the fire chief of a Fire Department sub-station and presented his rescue plan.  The fire chief told Goodwin he needed to climb a building to learn of the dangers of high-rise firefighting and rescue. The following Memorial Day, Goodwin scaled the outside of the Sears Tower in Chicago (renamed the Willis Tower in 2009), which at the time was the tallest building in the world.

Notable building climbs

Sears Tower 
On Memorial Day, May 25, 1981, wearing  a Spider-Man suit  and using suction cups, camming devices, and sky hooks, Goodwin  scaled the then-tallest building in the world, the 110-story Sears Tower in Chicago, Illinois.  For seven hours, Goodwin fought the high-altitude winds, slippery glass, and repeated attempts by the Chicago Fire Department to stop him.  A few feet below the top Goodwin taped an American flag to the building to honor his father, who fought in the Korean War. Chicago's press dubbed him "SpiderDan".  Goodwin said he scaled the building to call attention to inadequacies in high-rise firefighting and rescue.

Renaissance Tower 
On November 7, 1981, wearing a Spider-Man suit and using suction cups along with his hands and feet, Goodwin scaled the 56-story Renaissance Tower in Dallas, Texas. Goodwin said he made the climb to keep a promise he made to a young Dallas resident stricken with cystic fibrosis.

John Hancock Center 
On November 11, 1981, wearing a wetsuit disguised as a Spider-Man suit and using a climbing device he designed for the building, Goodwin scaled the 100-story John Hancock Center in Chicago.  To elude firemen who were descending toward him in a window-washing machine, Goodwin swung across the building with a rope. The fire department, on the inside of the building, used fire axes to shatter window glass near Goodwin and then through the openings attempted to dislodge him from the building with grappling hooks attached to long poles.  Chicago's mayor, Jane Byrne, intervened, allowing Goodwin to continue to the top. Goodwin said he made the climb to call attention to the inability to successfully fight fires in high-rise buildings.

North Tower of the World Trade Center 
On Memorial Day, May 30, 1983, using suction cups for the first four floors before switching to a camming device he connected to the building's window-washing track, Goodwin scaled the North Tower of the World Trade Center in New York City.  Goodwin attached an American flag, the same one he taped to the Sears Tower in 1981, to the upper-most floor of the North Tower in tribute to Americans who died in war. Goodwin said he made the climb to call attention to the inability to rescue trapped occupants from the upper levels of skyscrapers.

CN Tower 
On June 26, 1986, Goodwin scaled the world's tallest structure (not building) at the time: the CN Tower in Toronto, Ontario. Using his hands and feet, Goodwin climbed one side, rappelled down, then climbed the far side of the tower, followed by another rappel. Goodwin's climb was a sponsored publicity event celebrating the CN Tower's tenth anniversary.

Millennium Tower 

On September 6, 2010, Goodwin scaled the Millennium Tower in San Francisco, California, United States. In tribute to the United States, Goodwin attached a United States flag to the top of the Millennium Tower, the same flag he attached to the top of Chicago's Sears Tower in 1981 and to the top of the North Tower of New York's World Trade Center in 1983. Goodwin said he made the climb to call attention to the inability to conduct rescue operations in the upper floors of skyscrapers. In addition, as a Stage Four cancer survivor, Goodwin wanted to inspire people throughout the world who have been diagnosed with cancer.

Torre Telefónica Chile 
On average, the safety anchors were 4 to 6 floors apart, raising the possibility of a  fall or more. Commentators believed the weight of the rope made his ascent considerably more dangerous. The ascent was recorded for a TV show that was planned to be aired in the fall of 2014.

Rock and sports climbing 
As a rock climber, Goodwin made several first ascents. Frequently, he broke with rock climbing tradition by climbing without a rope, performing acrobatic maneuvers including the one arm fly-off and flag maneuver. In response to those in the rock climbing community who called Goodwin's acrobatic moves "stunts", and therefore unworthy of recognition, Goodwin stated he was "sport climbing" and not bound by the rules of traditional rock climbing.

Rock climber Jeff Lowe, along with Dick Bass, the owner of the Snowbird ski resort, invited Goodwin to build the climbing wall for the world's first International Sport Climbing Championship held at Snowbird, Utah, United States, in 1988. Goodwin did not participate in the championship, serving instead as a commentator for CBS Sports.

Skyscraper defense bill 
Following the 1993 World Trade Center bombing, Goodwin wrote a bill he called the "Skyscraper Defense Act", calling for an agency within the United States government entitled "Skyscraper Defense" as well as teams of "Skyscraper Defenders", individuals trained in skyscraper defense, security, and safety protocol, to be stationed within major cities of the United States.

See also 
Harry Gardiner
Ivan Kristoff
Philippe Petit
Owen Quinn
Alain Robert
George Willig

Notes

External links 
BBC news report on climbing of the Sears Tower
Buildering, Climbing Buildings
SkyscraperDefenseAct

Living people
1955 births
Urban climbers
Free soloists
American rock climbers
People from Kennebunkport, Maine